Christopher Patrick Ziadie (8 July 1967 – 18 September 2022) was a Jamaican professional football player and manager who played as a midfielder. He made six appearances for the Jamaica national team.

Coaching career
Following his retirement, Ziadie went into management, being named assistant coach of the Jamaica under-20 team in 1999, having previously been coaching Real Mona. He was also head coach at Waterhouse.

Personal life
Hailing from a footballing family, Ziadie's father was former Jamaican international Dennis Ziadie. His brothers Craig and Nick also represented Jamaica.

While giving a speech at the Columbia University's athletic awards banquet in 1989, Ziadie caused uproar when he gave a speech offending a number of people. His speech was stopped mid-way through by athletic director Al Paul, after numerous people had already left the banquet in protest, and fencer David Mandell had thrown a chair on stage.

Death 
Chris Ziadie died on 18 September 2022, in the United States at age 55 after a short battle with lung cancer. He was survived by his son Ryan and his daughter Chelsea.

Career statistics

References

1967 births
2022 deaths
Sportspeople from Kingston, Jamaica
Columbia Lions men's soccer players
Jamaican footballers
Jamaica youth international footballers
Jamaica international footballers
Association football midfielders
Jamaican expatriate footballers
Jamaican expatriate sportspeople in the United States
Expatriate soccer players in the United States
Jamaican football managers